was a private junior college in Mito, Ibaraki, Japan, established in 1964. The predecessor of the school was founded in 1948.

External links
 Official website 

Japanese junior colleges
Educational institutions established in 1964
Private universities and colleges in Japan
Universities and colleges in Ibaraki Prefecture
1964 establishments in Japan